The 2003–04 FA Trophy is the 34th season of the FA Trophy, the Football Association's cup competition for teams at levels 5–8 of the English football league system. It was contested by Hednesford Town and Canvey Island on 23 May 2004 at Villa Park, Birmingham.

Hednesford Town won the match 3–2 to win the competition for the first time in their history.

Road to Villa Park

Match

References 

2003-04
2003–04 domestic association football cups
FA Trophy
Canvey Island F.C. matches
Hednesford Town F.C. matches
May 2004 sports events in the United Kingdom